Lieutenant Colonel Sir Charles John Howell Thomas, KCB, KCMG, TD (1874 – 26 November 1943) was an English civil servant and diplomat. He was surveyor to the Metropolitan Board of Works before the First World War, when he served as an officer; after the war, he represented the UK on the International Valuation Board Reparation Commission in Paris (1920–21), the International Committee on Ceded Property (1922) and the Compensation (Ireland) Commission (1922–25). He was then Chief Valuer to the Board of Inland Revenue (1925–27) before serving as Permanent Secretary to the Ministry of Agriculture and Fisheries from 1927 to 1936; he represented the UK at the Imperial Agricultural Bureaux from 1928 to 1927 and was part of the UK's delegation at the Ottawa Conference (1932) and the World Monetary and Economic Conference (1934). From 1936 to his death, he was chairman of the Tithe Redemption Committee.

References 

1874 births
1943 deaths
English civil servants
Knights Companion of the Order of the Bath
Knights Commander of the Order of St Michael and St George